Blessed Unrest is the first album by Perth band The Holy Sea.

The album was recorded in 1999 at Jewell Studios in Perth by Tim Jewell and was released in 2000.

The cover art was designed by Girish Sagaram.

The album was critically well received in Perth, with The West Australian noting:

Track listing

Musicians
Henry F. Skerrit – Vocals, Guitar, Piano
David Bryceland – Drums
Cameron Knight - Bass
Kate Mathewson – Cello
Peter Thomsett – Guitar
Duncan Mah – Guitar
Matthew Ford – Rhodes
Chris Cobillis – Lap Steel
Ben Basell – Organ

2000 albums
The Holy Sea albums